Narayan Singh Kesari (born 2 July 1929) is an Indian politician of the Bharatiya Janata Party and a member of the Parliament of India representing Madhya Pradesh in the Rajya Sabha, the upper house of the Parliament.आष्टा मध्य प्रदेश विधानसभा से पूर्व विधायक 1975-1978।

External links
 Profile on Rajya Sabha website 

Bharatiya Janata Party politicians from Madhya Pradesh
Rajya Sabha members from Madhya Pradesh
Living people
1936 births
Politicians from Indore